The Carmacks Group is a Late Cretaceous volcanic group in southwest-central Yukon, Canada, located between the communities of Dawson City and Whitehorse. It consists of flood basalts, coarse volcaniclastic rocks and sandy tuffs interbedded with subordinate andesite and basaltic lava flows. It has been interpreted to be a displaced portion of the Yellowstone hotspot track that was formed 70 million years ago.

See also
Volcanism of Northern Canada

References

Hotspot volcanism
Volcanism of Yukon
Cretaceous volcanism
Volcanic groups
Flood basalts
Yellowstone hotspot